Bob Montgomery (February 10, 1919 – August 25, 1998) was an American lightweight boxer who took the New York State Athletic Commission (NYSAC) World Lightweight Championship in May 1943, and again in March 1944. His managers included Frankie Thomas and Joe Gramby.

Early life and career
Montgomery was born on February 10, 1919, in Sumter, South Carolina. He came to Philadelphia in 1934 during the depression and found a job as a "puller" in a laundry where he pulled clothes out of large industrial laundering machines. He began amateur boxing and training at the "Slaughterhouse", a gym on Philadelphia's Eighth Street and Girard Avenue.

He went undefeated in his first 23 fights, with a record of 22-0-1 and won the Pennsylvania State Lightweight Title in a bout against Mike Evens on October 24, 1939, in Philadelphia.

On September 16, 1940, Montgomery lost to Lew Jenkins in a ten-round unanimous decision before a crowd of 12,900 at Shibe Park in Philadelphia. Jenkins was down in the third round for a count of nine. The United Press gave Jenkins five rounds to four for Montgomery, though ring officials gave Jenkins a somewhat wider margin.

Montgomery was the uncle of Motown Records star Tammi Terrell (born Thomasina "Tommy" Montgomery).

Boxing career
Montgomery beat Julie Kogon three times. Their first fight was at the Broadway Arena in Brooklyn on January 28, 1941, and Montgomery won by decision. They fought again on October 24 that year, at the Chicago Coliseum, with Montgomery again winning by decision. The two squared off for the last time on June 2, 1947, in Kogon's hometown at the New Haven Arena, and Montgomery had another decision win.

Montgomery lost to former lightweight champ Sammy Angott by split decision at Shibe Park on July 7, 1942.

In 1942 Montgomery had two battles with Maxie Shapiro. In the first fight Montgomery lost by decision in Philadelphia, but he won the rematch two months later by unanimous decision in the same arena.

Taking the NYSAC World Lightweight Title from Beau Jack, May 1943

Montgomery won recognition by New York state as Lightweight Champion of the World after beating Beau Jack by a fifteen-round unanimous decision on May 21, 1943. Jack won the first round by a wide margin with a flurry of uppercuts and his signature free-wheeling, constant punching from many angles. But Montgomery quickly settled down and scored frequently with a strong straight right that at times had Jack close to a knockout and against which he could find no adequate defense. Jack's eyes were virtually closed during much of the bout, but Montgomery's injuries were restricted to a cut above one eye. A right to the chin briefly knocked Jack to his knees in the eleventh round and he struggled in the remaining rounds. One ringside reporter gave Montgomery eleven rounds to only four for Jack.

Montgomery beat Petey Scalzo in a sixth-round TKO in Philadelphia on October 25, 1943, in Convention Hall in Philadelphia. Montgomery knocked down Scalzo three times during the bout.

Losing the NYSAC World Lightweight Title to Beau Jack, November 1943
Montgomery lost the NYSAC World Lightweight Title to Jack in a fifteen-round title match by decision before 17,466 fans on November 19, 1943, at the Garden. The bout was close and in the fourteenth, Montgomery may have had Jack close to a knockout. The United Press scored eight for Jack, five for Montgomery, with two even, though a few of the judges gave as many as six rounds to Montgomery.  Jack excelled in both in-fighting and at long range boxing where Montgomery, with a slight advantage in height, would normally have the advantage. Jack's straight rights had Montgomery shaky in the third and fifth rounds.

On January 25, 1944, Montgomery impressively knocked out powerful Black lightweight Ike Williams in the twelfth round at Convention Hall in Philadelphia.  Montgomery hammered Williams repeatedly in the first eleven rounds.  As Williams walked out of his corner for the twelfth round, Mongtomery tagged him with a series of straight rights that twice floored him for eight counts.  Upon rising, Montgomery floored Williams for the final count with a right to the jaw, and he went down by the ropes. Williams would take the World Lightweight Championship in April 1945, holding it for several years.

Montgomery lost to Al "Bummy" Davis at Madison Square Garden in a non-title bout before 17,654 fans in a first-round KO on February 18, 1944. Montgomery went down once, before rising and being knocked to the mat by a left hook for a full count 1:03 into the first round.

Re-taking the NYSAC World Lightweight Title from Beau Jack, November 1944
He retook the title from Beau Jack on March 3, 1944, at Madison Square Garden in a fifteen-round split decision before 19,066 fans. Jack had led in the early betting. The fighting was fierce and close throughout and Montgomery was given no more than a two-round advantage by the judges or referee, though the Associated Press scored the bout 8 for Montgomery, 4 for Jack, and three even. After the bout, Montgomery was drafted into the US Army. He continued to box while serving in the Army and was released by June 1946, when he defeated Allie Stoltz.

On February 13, 1945, Montgomery had a fierce bout with Cecil Hudson at the Olympic Auditorium in Los Angeles, California, winning in a ten-round decision.  Montgomery received a furlough from active Army duty at Luke Field Arizona, and had not appeared in a competitive match for four months. Through the first six rounds, Montgomery was perplexed by Hudson's dodges and weaves, and unable to land many solid blows. Hudson was knocked to the canvas after the bell in the fourth, and was down very briefly in the eighth and ninth rounds, once Montgomery found his range. Until the two knockdowns, Hudson was leading slightly in points, according to the United Press scoring. In the fury of fighting, one source noted that Montgomery was penalized in a few rounds for hitting after the bell.

Defending the NYSAC World Lightweight Title against Allie Stoltz, and Wesley Mouzon, 1946
He successfully defended his second NYSAC World Lightweight Title against Allie Stoltz before 10,872 fans at Madison Square Garden in a thirteenth-round knockout on June 28, 1946. The telling blow was a right to Stolz, 2:54 into the thirteenth, but in a decisive win, Montgomery put Stoltz on the canvas as many as five times prior to the final knockout. Stoltz was down in second, sixth, and eleventh rounds. He may have lacked conditioning from his four and a half month layoff from the ring. He fought gamely and continued to take punishment, even landing a solid right to the chin of Montgomery in the sixth round.

On November 26, 1946, Montgomery defended his NYSAC World Lightweight Title against Wesley Mouzon in an eighth-round knockout at Convention Hall in Philadelphia, Pennsylvania before a substantial crowd, of 12,416. Surprisingly, he had just lost to Mouzon by knockout in a non-title bout only three months previously on August 19, 1946, at Shibe Park in Philadelphia. In their fiercely fought November title match, Mouzon took the first three rounds with speed and jabs, but Montgomery countered with body blows and rights, before ending the bout 2:18 into the eighth with a long left hook. Mouzon took a serious lacing throughout all but the first round, and had a serious injury to his right eye.

On February 7, 1947, Montgomery had a difficult loss to Tony Pellone before a crowd of 11,365 at Olympia Stadium in Detroit in a ten-round unanimous decision. The Associated Press wrote that the crowd was satisfied with the decision for Pellone even though he was the underdog in the bout. Pellone took the aggressive with hard punches to the face and head of his opponent. Montgomery slipped to the canvas in the second for a count of two.

Losing second World Lightweight Title, August 1947
He lost the World Lightweight Title for the last time against Ike Williams in a six-round TKO on August 4, 1947, at Municipal Stadium in Philadelphia, Pennsylvania. Montgomery was first knocked for a nine count in the sixth, and eventually the referee stopped the bout after Montgomery seemed helpless against the attacks of Williams. The blow that sent Montgomery to the mat for a count of nine in the sixth was a right to the chin by the hard punching Williams. Williams was four years younger, which may have played a role in the advantage he had against the ring weary Montgomery.

Life after boxing
Montgomery became a promoter at the end of his career. He was inducted into the International Boxing Hall of Fame in 1995.

He died of complications from a stroke at Veterans Affairs Medical Center in Coatsville, outside Philadelphia on August 25, 1998. He is buried at Indiantown Gap National Cemetery in Annville, Pennsylvania.

Professional boxing record

Boxing achievements and honors

See also
 International Boxing Hall of Fame

References

External links
 
 "Bobcat" Bob Montgomery at the Cyber Boxing Zone Encyclopedia

1919 births
1998 deaths
African-American boxers
World lightweight boxing champions
Boxers from Pennsylvania
Boxers from South Carolina
Lightweight boxers
American male boxers
United States Army personnel of World War II
United States Army soldiers
African Americans in World War II
African-American United States Army personnel
20th-century African-American sportspeople
International Boxing Hall of Fame inductees